Haslinger is a surname. Notable people with the surname include:

Josef Haslinger (born 1955), Austrian writer
Paul Haslinger (born 1962), Austrian-born American composer and musician
Stewart Haslinger (born 1981), English chess grandmaster
Tobias Haslinger, Austrian composer and music publisher